Owenboy is a national nature reserve and Ramsar site of approximately  in County Mayo.

Features
Owenboy was legally protected as a national nature reserve by the Irish government in 1986. In 1987, the site was also declared Ramsar site number 371.

The reserve contains an extensive lowland intermediate bog in a broad basin, with some low domes which resemble raised bog. There are also numerous pools, flushes, subterranean and surface streams, swallowholes, and spring-fed fens. A rare species of moss has been recorded on the site. The Greenland white-fronted goose uses the area as a winter feeding site.

References

Bogs of the Republic of Ireland
Landforms of County Mayo
Protected areas of County Mayo
Tourist attractions in County Mayo
Nature reserves in the Republic of Ireland
Protected areas established in 1986
1986 establishments in Ireland
Ramsar sites in the Republic of Ireland